United Nations Security Council resolution 904 was adopted without a vote on 18 March 1994. After expressing its shock at the massacre committed against Palestinian worshippers in the Cave of the Patriarchs (Mosque of Ibrahim) in Hebron in the West Bank, the Council called for measures to be taken to guarantee the safety and protection of the Palestinian civilians throughout the occupied territory.

Concern was expressed at the Palestinian casualties in the occupied Palestinian territory as a result of the massacre, which took place during the Muslim month of Ramadan, which underlined the need to provide protection and security for the Palestinian people. The Council noted with satisfaction the efforts undertaken to guarantee the smooth proceeding of the peace process and the condemnation of the incident by the international community. It also reaffirmed the applicability of the Fourth Geneva Convention and the responsibilities of Israel.

The Council condemned the incident at Hebron, which resulted in 30–54 fatalities and injuries to several hundred civilians, calling upon Israel to confiscate arms in order to prevent acts of violence by Israeli settlers. In calling for measures to be taken to protect Palestinian civilians, the Council requested the co-sponsors of the peace process, the United States and Russia, to continue to use their efforts in the peace process to bring about the implementation of the aforementioned provisions.

Finally, the resolution reaffirmed its support of the Declaration of Principles and urged its immediate implementation.

See also
 Arab–Israeli conflict
 Israeli–Palestinian conflict
 List of United Nations Security Council Resolutions 901 to 1000 (1994–1995)

References

External links
 
Text of the Resolution at undocs.org

 0904
 0904
Israeli–Palestinian conflict and the United Nations
1994 in Israel
March 1994 events